This is the complete list of Commonwealth Games medallists in field hockey from 1998 to 2022.

Medallists

Men's

Women's

External links
Results Database from the Commonwealth Games Federation

References

Field
Medalists

Commonwealth